NBE may refer to: 
 National Bank of Egypt
 National Board of Examinations, an Indian medical license board
 New Bach Edition
 Nordbahn Eisenbahngesellschaft, a German railway company
 Negative buoyant energy
 Non business entity
 Norfolk Board of Education, a former school district in Ontario, Canada
 Enfidha-Hammamet International Airport's IATA code
 Normalisation by evaluation